Elva is a rural parish in the Estonian Tartu County with an area of . As of 2017, it has a population of 14241 inhabitants. It was created in 2017 from the merger of the municipality Elva with the rural communities Konguta Parish, Puhja Parish, Rannu Parish and Rõngu Parish.

In addition to the main town Elva (5669 inhabitants), a number of villages are part of the parish including Annikoru, Ervu, Härjanurme, Järvaküla, Järveküla, Käärdi, Kaarlijärve, Kaimi, Kalme, Kapsta, Karijärve, Kipastu, Kirepi, Kobilu, Kõduküla, Konguta, Koopsi, Koruste, Külaaseme, Kulli, Kurelaane, Kureküla, Lapetukme, Lembevere, Lossimäe, Mäeotsa, Mäeselja, Majala, Mälgi, Metsalaane, Mõisanurme, Nasja, Neemisküla, Noorma, Paju, Palupõhja, Piigandi, Poole, Pööritsa, Poriküla, Raigaste, Ramsi, Rannaküla, Ridaküla, Rõngu, Saare, Sangla, Suure-Rakke, Tamme, Tammiste, Tännassilma, Teedla, Teilma, Tilga, Uderna, Ulila, Utukolga, Vahessaare, Väike-Rakke, Valguta, Vallapalu, Vehendi, Vellavere, Verevi, Vihavu, Võllinge, and Võsivere.

Religion

References

External links